Grøtavær is a coastal fishing village in Harstad Municipality in Troms og Finnmark county, Norway. Grøtavær Church is located in the village and the Grøtavær islands are located just off shore.

References

Harstad
Villages in Troms